The Christian Century is a Christian magazine based in Chicago, Illinois. Considered the flagship magazine of US mainline Protestantism, the monthly reports on religious news; comments on theological, moral, and cultural issues; and reviews books, movies, and music. 

The Centurys current editor and publisher is Peter W. Marty, while Steve Thorngate is its managing editor. Regular columns include:

 From the Editor/Publisher, by Peter W. Marty
 From the Editors
 Notes from the Global Church, by Philip Jenkins
 Screen Time, by Kathryn Reklis
 Faith Matters, by Craig Barnes, Debra Dean Murphy, Stephanie Paulsell, Debie Thomas, and Sam Wells
 On Art, by Lil Copan, Heidi Hornik, and Mikeal Parsons

The Century website hosts podcasts by Grace Ji-Sun Kim, Amy Frykholm, Cassidy Hall, Matt Fitzgerald, Matt Gaventa, and Adam Hearlson. 

The magazine's editorial stance has been described as "liberal." It describes its own mission as follows:For decades, the Christian Century has informed and shaped progressive, mainline Christianity. Committed to thinking critically and living faithfully, the magazine explores what it means to believe and live out the Christian faith in our time. As a voice of generous orthodoxy, the Century is both loyal to the church and open to the world.

History 

The Christian Century was founded in 1884 as The Christian Oracle in Des Moines, Iowa, as a Disciples of Christ denominational magazine.

In 1900, its editor proposed to rename it Christian Century in response to the great optimism of many Christians at the turn of the 20th century that "genuine Christian faith could live in mutual harmony with the modern developments in science, technology, immigration, communication and culture that were already under way." Around this same time, the Century offices moved to Chicago.

The magazine did not receive widespread support in its denomination and was sold in a mortgage foreclosure in 1908. It was purchased by Charles Clayton Morrison, who soon labeled the magazine nondenominational. Morrison became a highly influential spokesperson for liberal Christianity, advocating higher criticism of the Bible, as well as the Social Gospel, which included concerns about child labor, women's suffrage, racism, war and pacifism, alcoholism and prohibition, environmentalism, and many other political and social issues. The magazine was a common target for criticism by fundamentalists during the fundamentalist–modernist debate of the early 20th century.

During the Second World War, the magazine helped provide a venue for promotion of ideas by Christian activists who opposed the internment of Japanese Americans. Critiques of the internment policy, by writers such as Galen Fisher, appeared regularly in the Century and helped bring awareness to the situation. 

In 1956 the magazine was challenged by the establishment of Christianity Today by Carl F. H. Henry, which sought to present a theologically conservative evangelical viewpoint, while restoring many social concerns abandoned by fundamentalists. Both magazines continue to flourish, with the Century remaining the major independent publication within ecumenical, mainline Protestantism.

The magazine was heavily involved in covering and advocating for the civil rights movement. It sent editors to a march in Selma, Alabama in 1965 and was one of the first national magazines to publish Martin Luther King Jr.'s "Letter from Birmingham Jail" along with six of his other essays.

In 2008 both Martin E. Marty and former editor James M. Wall concluded long runs as Century columnists. 

Other writers published by the Century over its long history include Jane Addams, Albert Schweitzer, W. E. B. DuBois, Reuben Markham, C. S. Lewis, W. H. Auden, T. S. Eliot, Reinhold Niebuhr, Richard John Neuhaus, Paul Tillich, John F. Kennedy, Dwight D. Eisenhower, Thomas Merton, James Cone, Rosemary Rutherford, Mary Daly, Billy Graham, Wendell Berry, Henri Nouwen, N. T. Wright, Delores S. Williams, Sarah Coakley, Rowan Williams, and Marilynne Robinson.

Accusations of antisemitism 
The magazine has been accused of being antisemitic during the editorial reign of Morrison in the 1930s and 1940s. It published articles: opposing American intervention in World War II for the benefit of the Jews persecuted under the Nazis; arguing moral equivalence between an alleged Jewish-nationalist crucifixion of Jesus and the Nazi persecution of Jews; condemning American Jews for maintaining their distinct identity; and a rebuttal to Rabbi Stephen Wise, president of the World Jewish Congress, claiming he was exaggerating the Holocaust. As late as 1944 the magazine published articles such as "A Reply to Screamers" by Fred Eastman which admonished the suggestion that there was a moral obligation for the United States to aid in the plight of European Jews being murdered during the Holocaust. Marty, writing about the 1940s, described the Christian Century at that time as being an "anti-Zionist" publication.

Beginning in 2012, James M. Wall (editor from 1972-1999) served on the editorial board of VNN, an online news and opinion site that the Southern Poverty Law Centre identified as a neo-Nazi hate site. Wall's name was retained on the Christian Century masthead from 2012 to 2017, despite his association with VNN, drawing criticism. 

In 2017 Wall's name was removed from the masthead. In Christian Century's 2021 obituary of Wall, Marty conceded "Wall's extensive pro-Palestinian writing at times devolved into anti-Semitism." In recent years, the magazine has published both pro-Palestine and pro-Israel authors and argued for a two-state solution to the conflict.

References

Sources

 Christian Century, "Milestones."
 Elesha Coffman, "A Long Ride on the Mainline," Books and Culture, November 14, 2008.
 Elesha Coffman, The Christian Century and the Rise of the Protestant Mainline. New York: Oxford University Press, 2013. online review
 John Dart, "The Rise and Fall of Protestant Magazines," Christian Century, December 26, 2006, 
 Linda-Marie Delloff, "Charles Clayton Morrison: Shaping a Journal's Identity," Christian Century, January 18, 1984.
 Robert Shaffer, "Opposition to Internment."

External links 

Christian Century Foundation Archives, 1908-2003 at Southern Illinois University Carbondale, Special Collections Research Century

Antisemitism in the United States
Anti-Zionism in the United States
Monthly magazines published in the United States
Christian magazines
Magazines established in 1884
Magazines published in Chicago
Religious magazines published in the United States
1884 establishments in Iowa